Amalodeta electraula is a moth of the subfamily Arctiinae. It is found in New Guinea.

References

Moths described in 1889
Lithosiini
Moths of New Guinea